Ikingi Maryut is an area in the Western Desert, outside Alexandria, Egypt. It was the site of an Allied staging camp during World War II.
Ikingi Maryout also contains a rest house for the king

References
Time Magazine
113 Squadron RAF

Geography of Egypt
Western Desert (Egypt)
World War II sites in Egypt
Places